Domi may refer to:

People
Domi (musician), French keyboardist, collaborator with drummer JD Beck
Didier Domi (born 1978), French footballer
Mahir Domi (1915-2000), Albanian linguist
Tie Domi (born 1969), Canadian retired ice hockey player
Max Domi (born 1995), Canadian ice hockey player and son of Tie Domi
Dominique Moceanu (born 1981), American gymnast
Dominika Cibulková (born 1984), Slovak tennis player
Domi (footballer) (born 2004), Mario Domínguez Franco, Spanish footballer
Dom people or Domi, an Indo-Aryan ethnic group
DomiDoodles or simply Domi, is an artist.

Other uses
We Are Domi, also known as Domi, a musical group
Binə, Khojavend, Azerbaijan, a village also known as Domi
DOM Inspector, software
Domi plural of domus, the Latin term meaning house or home